Derek Arthur Ware (27 February 1938 – 22 September 2015) was an English actor and stuntman, active from the late 1950s through the 1990s.

Ware's parents were Arthur, a music hall performer, and his wife Margaret. After graduating from RADA in 1957, his earliest television work was on the BBC's cycle of Shakespeare's history plays, An Age of Kings (1960), as both actor and stunt arranger. For the director Peter Watkins, Ware was involved in the production of the docudramas, Culloden (1964) and The War Game (1966), both for the BBC.

Ware was a stuntman and fight arranger for the early seasons of Doctor Who on which his company Havoc, founded in 1966, was involved as well as many other television shows into the 1970s, for both the BBC and ITV. The company entirely dominating the stunt work field for a time, but had been dissolved by the end of the 1970s. He worked on Z-Cars, the original The Italian Job (1969), in which he also played the role of Rozzer, and later, on EastEnders.

Filmography

References

External links
 

1938 births
2015 deaths
English male television actors
English stunt performers
Male actors from Manchester
Alumni of RADA